Karween is a locality situated on the Redcliffs-Merringur Road in the Sunraysia region, south of the Sturt Highway. It is about 9 kilometres (about 5.6 miles) east from Morkalla and 6 kilometres (about 3.7 miles) west from Meringur. The railway arrived soon after the area was settled by returned servicemen after World War I, in 1931, and closed in 1964. Karween had a progress association operating in the 1930s.

References